The 12th National Congress of the Chinese Communist Party was convened from September 1–11, 1982, five years before the 13th National Congress of the Chinese Communist Party convened.  The path of modernization through socialism was laid out.

It was preceded by the 11th National Congress of the Chinese Communist Party. It coincided with the time in which leader Deng Xiaoping was Chairman of the Central Advisory Commission.

At the 12th National Congress, Hu Yaobang's report addressed the Chinese diplomatic concept of the Five Principles of Peaceful Coexistence, stating, "China adheres to an independent foreign policy and develops relationships with other countries under the guidance of the Five Principles of Peaceful Coexistence." According to the view articulated by Hu in his report, "China will never be dependent on any big country or group of countries, nor will it yield to the pressure of any big country [...] The Five Principles of Peaceful Coexistence apply to our relations with all countries, including socialist countries."

See also
 Chinese Communist Party Admission Oath
 12th Central Committee of the Chinese Communist Party

References

1982 conferences
1982 in China
National Congress of the Chinese Communist Party